Jean Bessie Lumb,  (1919–2002) was the first Chinese Canadian woman and the first restaurateur to receive the Order of Canada for her community work. Most notably, she was recognized for her pivotal role in changing Canada’s immigration laws that separated Chinese families and for her contribution in saving Toronto's First Chinatown and Chinatowns in other cities.

Early life
Lumb, one of twelve children, was born in Nanaimo, British Columbia to Fun Gee Wong and Hone Hung Mah, both of Canton, China. Her father emigrated to Canada to work as a farm labourer. Lumb left school at the age of 12 to work and support her family. In 1935, she moved to Toronto and later opened her own grocery store as a 17-year-old.

Adulthood
Jean Lumb married Doyle Jenning Lumb in 1939 in Toronto, who had come to Canada from China, and they had 6 children. Although Lumb was born in Canada she lost her Canadian status after her marriage and regained it in 1947. Her husband was born in China and remained stateless until 1947 and died in 1989.

The mother of six children and grandmother of nine grandchildren, Jean Lumb was the co-owner (with husband Doyle Lumb) and director of the Kwong Chow Restaurant in Toronto for 23 years. The restaurant was highly successful and popular with both Chinese and Westerners, with many politicians a clientele due to its proximity to Toronto's city hall.

Lumb was very active in community work throughout her life. She was instrumental in organizing the campaign to save Toronto's First Chinatown from complete demolition and galvanized the community against further expropriation later of remaining portions on Dundas Street. She was also a major force, and the sole woman, in the 1957 delegation from the Chinese community lobbying the government of John Diefenbaker to repeal the explicit racial discrimination from the immigration laws of the time containing race-based criteria for admission to Canada.

She achieved many firsts in Toronto. This included being the:
First Chinese woman on the board of governors of the Women’s College Hospital.
First Chinese woman on the board of University Settlement House
First Chinese restaurateur and first woman to receive the Fran Deck Award for outstanding achievement in Toronto’s restaurant industry.
First Chinese-Canadian woman to sit on the board of Rotary-Laughlen Centre.
She also served as director and honorary advisor of the Yee Hong Chinese Nursing Home for Greater Toronto and the Chinese Cultural Centre of Greater Toronto, respectively.

Positions
1957: Immigration Appeal Act (Only woman invited to Ottawa to represent Chinese families separated by immigration laws)
1950 - 1972: Women's Association of the Chinese Dramatic Society, president and director
1959 - 1981: Kwong Chow Chop Suey House, Toronto, co-owner and director
1959 - 1970: Chinese Community Dancers of Ontario, director and producer (Command Performance for and presentation to Her Majesty, Queen Elizabeth II, Ottawa, 1967
1959 - 1967: Toronto Chinese Public School, trustee and director
1962 - 1968: University Settlement House (First Chinese-Canadian woman to sit on the board of directors)
1963 - 1998: Lem Si Ho Tong Family Association Women's Group, president and director
1966 - 1982: Rotary-Laughlen Centre (First Chinese-Canadian woman to sit on the board)
1970 - 1982: Women's College Hospital (First Chinese-Canadian woman to sit on the board of Governors)
1970: "Save Chinatown" Campaign, chairperson
1973 - 1982: Ontario Advisory Council on Multiculturalism
1985 - 1999: Mount Sinai Hospital, director
1985 - 1998: University Settlement House, patron
1986 - 1990: Canadian Music Competition for Ontario, patron
1987 - 1990: Summer Centres for Seniors, director
1992: Twinning of Chung King and Toronto, advisory board member
1994: Ontario Women's Directorate, honorary member
1994 - 2001: Citizenship Judge
1994           Yee Hong Chinese Nursing Home for Greater Toronto, founding director
1994           Chinese Cultural Centre of Greater Toronto, honorary advisor

Family
Lumb's brothers Robert (1917-1987) and Tommy Wong also moved to Toronto, where they founded Central Airways School (formerly Wong's Air School), that taught flying at Toronto Island Airport. Their flying school closed down in the early 1980s. Robert lived in east end Toronto and Tommy in west-end Toronto. Lumb's daughter, Arlene Chan, is a prolific author and a historian of Toronto's Chinatowns and the Chinese Canadian community.

Awards and honours

1976: Order of Canada (First Chinese-Canadian woman and First Canadian restaurateur)
1977: Queen’s Silver Jubilee Award
1977: Recipient of the Governor General’s Award
1982: The Fran Deck Award In recognition of Toronto’s leading contributor to the restaurant industry (First woman recipient)
1983: Special Award to Honour Special Chinese Canadians (Presented by the Chinese Canadian National Council in honour of Chinese in Canada and their 125 years of continuous community)
1984: Recipient of the City of Toronto Award of Merit, Special Sesquicentennial presentation on Civic Honours Day First Chinese-Canadian woman
1984: Award, Ontario Chinese Restaurant Association
1990: The Chinese Community Nursing Home for Greater Toronto, Tribute at the first annual Dragon Ball
1994: YWCA Women of Change Honour Roll
1996: Tribute to Madam Jean Lumb Banquet: Mid-Autumn Gala for the Jean Lumb Awards
1997: Elizabeth Fry Society, Rebel for a Cause Honouree
1997: Chinese Family and Health Cooperative, Mother of the Year Award
2000: Order of the Knights of Rizal
2002: Queen’s Golden Jubilee Award
2007: Association of Chinese Canadian Entrepreneurs, Lifetime Achievement Award
2009: Provincial Historical Plaque Unveiling, Ontario Heritage Trust
2017: TDSB Jean Lumb Public School

Media

Filmography
Jean Lumb, Loving spoonfuls, Episode 2, Indivisual Productions Inc., 2001.
Quo Vadis, Mrs. Lumb?, National Film Board of Canada, 1965.
Spirit of the dragon, written, directed and produced by Gil Gauvreau, Convergence Productions, 2002. (Winner of the National Film Board of Canada's Outstanding Documentary Award at the Reel World Festival 2003)
Under the willow tree: pioneer Chinese women in Canada, National Film Board of Canada, 1997.

Exhibition
"But women did come: a photographic exhibition on Chinese Canadian women", Chinese Canadian National Council, 1993.

References

Becker, William B. "Dining Out in Toronto: Kwongchow Chop Suey Tavern. "Michigan Living Motor News, vol. 61, no. 11 (May 1979), p. 27.
"A Chinese Paragon: Jean Lumb, C.M." Imagination 13 (May 1990), pp. 10–11.
Cannon, Margaret. "The Chinese Connection." Country Estate (Late Autumn 1990), pp. 35–44.
Chan, Arlene. Spirit of the dragon: Jean Lumb, a proud Chinese Canadian.  Toronto: Umbrella Press, 1997.
Chinese Canadian National Council, Women’s Committee.  Jin Guo: voices of Chinese Canadian women.  Toronto:  Women’s Press, 1992.
"Dragon Ball". Country Estate (Late Spring 1990), pp. 68–69.
Forster, Merna. "A Chinese Voice, Jean Lumb 1919-2002." 100 Canadian Heroines. Toronto: The Dundurn Group, 2004.
Growe, Sarah Jane. "Grandmothers are really cooking." Toronto Star (April 15, 2000),p. J16.
Growe, Sarah Jane. "Leaving a legacy important for us all." Toronto Star (November 24, 2001), p. M21.
Huang, Evelyn and Lawrence Jeffrey.  Voices from a community.  Vancouver:  Douglas & McIntyre, 1992.
"Jean Lumb Award." Chinese Education Journal (Canada) (Winter 1998), pp. 6–7, 8.
Keung, Nicholas. "A fresh look at our past." Toronto Star (October 8, 2004), p. B01.
Moore, Brian. "Toronto." National Geographic (n.d.), pp. 52–56.
Our grandmothers, ourselves: reflections on Canadian women. Edited by Gina Vallee. Toronto: Fitzhenry & Whiteside, 2005.
Sherwood, George. Legends in their time: young heroes and victims of Canada. Toronto:Natural Heritage Books, c2006.
"Someone’s in the Kitchen with David" Star Week (April 1–8, 2000), p. 6.
Stein, David Lewis. "Toronto: What makes It Tick?" Chatelaine (August 1978), pp. 36–37, 95.
Stollery, Peter. "The Emergence of the Chinese Establishment: West from Canton, East from Spadina and South for the Writer." Toronto Life. (December 1976), pp. 27–35.
Urquhart, Ian. "Chinatown Fights Back the High-Rise Shadows." The Telegram (June 21, 1971)

External links
 Jean Lumb Foundation
 Jean Lumb's Recipes, Living Spoonfuls
 Ontario Ministry of Citizenship and Immigration
 Former WCH Board Member Jean Lumb - A Visionary Women's College Hospital Newsletter, September 4, 2007.
 Book Review of The Spirit of the Dragon, the Story of Jean Lumb, CM, Vol.IV, no. 5, October 31, 1997 
 "Kin for Hire" (CBC Archives, May 29, 1960)
 Oral History Museum
 Ontario Heritage Trust - Plaques & Markers

1919 births
2002 deaths
Businesspeople from British Columbia
Businesspeople from Toronto
Canadian citizenship judges
Canadian restaurateurs
Canadian people of Chinese descent
Members of the Order of Canada
People from Nanaimo